Climate change in Maine encompasses the effects of climate change, attributed to man-made increases in atmospheric carbon dioxide, in the U.S. state of Maine.

The United States Environmental Protection Agency reports: "Maine's climate is changing. The state has warmed about three degrees (F) since the year 1900. Throughout the northeastern United States, spring is arriving earlier and bringing more precipitation, heavy rainstorms are more frequent, and summers are hotter and drier. Sea level is rising, and severe storms increasingly cause floods that damage property and infrastructure. In the coming decades, changing the climate is likely to increase flooding; harm ecosystems; disrupt fishing, agriculture, and winter recreation; and increase some risks to human health". In July 2019, Governor Janet Mills signed into law bipartisan legislation aimed at countering the effects of climate change.

Increasing temperature and changing precipitation patterns

"Rising temperatures and shifting rainfall patterns are likely to increase the intensity of both floods and droughts. Average annual precipitation in the Northeast increased 10 percent from 1895 to 2011, and precipitation from extremely heavy storms has increased 70 percent since 1958. During the next century, average annual precipitation and the frequency of heavy downpours are likely to keep rising. Average precipitation is likely to increase during winter and spring, but not change significantly during summer and fall. Rising temperatures will melt snow earlier in spring and increase evaporation, and thereby dry the soil during summer and fall. So flooding is likely to be worse during winter and spring, and droughts worse during summer and fall".

Sea level rise, wetland loss, and coastal flooding

"Rising sea level erodes wetlands and beaches and increases damage from coastal storms. Tidal wetlands are inherently vulnerable because of their low elevations, and shoreline development prevents them from migrating inland onto higher ground. Human activities such as filling wetlands have destroyed about one third of New England’s coastal wetlands since the early 1800s. Wetlands provide habitat for many bird species, such as osprey and heron, as well as several fish species. Losing coastal wetlands would harm coastal ecosystems and remove an important line of defense against coastal flooding".

"Coastal cities and towns will become more vulnerable to storms in the coming century as sea level rises, shorelines erode, and storm surges become higher. Storms can destroy coastal homes, wash out highways and rail lines, and damage essential communication, energy, and wastewater management infrastructure".

Ecosystems
"Changing the climate threatens ecosystems by disrupting relationships between species. Wildflowers and woody perennials are blooming—and migratory birds are arriving—sooner in spring. Not all species adjust in the same way, however, so the food that one species needs may no longer be available when that species arrives on its migration. Warmer temperatures allow deer populations to increase, leading to a loss of forest underbrush, which makes some animals more vulnerable to predators. Climate change can allow invasive species to expand their ranges. For example, the hemlock woolly adelgid has recently infested hemlock trees near the coast in southern Maine. Infestation eventually kills almost all hemlock trees, which are replaced by black oaks, black birch, and other hardwoods. Warmer temperatures are likely to enable the woolly adelgid to expand inland and up the coast. The loss of hemlock trees would remove the primary habitat for the blue-headed vireo and Blackburnian warbler. It could also cause streams to run dry or become excessively warm more often, harming brook trout and brown trout".

Harmful Algal Blooms in the Gulf of Maine 

A harmful algal bloom (HAB) occurs when toxin-producing algae grow excessively in a body of water. One of the most potent and commonly found genus of algae which contribute to harmful algal blooms is Pseudo-nitzschia. Many species within Pseudo-nitzschia produce domoic acid, a neurotoxin that bioaccumulates in shellfish, causing illness in humans and marine animals upon ingestion. HABs occur when conditions in the water are hyper-conducive for algae growth and the amount of algae, in most cases Pseudo-nitzschia, grows exponentially. 

In the Gulf of Maine, the occurrence of HABs have increased with many associating it with climate change. HABs have forced the closure of some New England shellfish beds to harvesting in recent years, causing a lapse in the region's clam, mussel and oyster supplies. Outbreaks in 2005 and 2008 were particularly harmful, resulting in extended closures.

The effects of climate change are diverse and broad, many of which contribute to increased HAB presence. Higher levels of carbon dioxide in the air and water can lead to rapid growth of algae. Increased sea levels would create more shallow and stable coastal water, conditions that are perfect for the growth of algae. Harmful algae usually bloom during the warm summer season or when water temperatures are warmer than usual. Warmer water due to climate change might favor the bloom of harmful algae like Pseudo-nitzschia.

Fishing and farms

"Parts of Maine's fishing and agriculture sectors may suffer as the climate changes. Rising water temperatures can lower oxygen levels and otherwise alter freshwater and marine ecosystems. Lobsters and other shellfish are vulnerable to increased ocean acidity, especially during early life stages when acidity impairs their ability to build shells. As ocean temperatures rise, some fish species are moving northward or into deeper waters to remain within their normal temperature range. The loss of coastal wetlands could harm clams, bass, and other commercially important fish".

"Climate change may also pose challenges for agriculture. Some farms may be harmed if more hot days and droughts reduce crop yields, or if more flooding and wetter springs delay their planting dates. Other farms may benefit from a longer growing season and the fertilizing effect of carbon dioxide. Rising temperatures may also affect maple syrup production, but the likely impact over the next few decades is unknown".

Winter recreation

"Warmer winters may bring more rain and less snow to Maine. A decline in snowfall would shorten the season during which the ground is covered with snow, which could harm recreational industries like skiing, snowboarding, and snowmobiling, and the local economies that depend on them".

State policy

In December 2019, Maine joined consideration for a multi-state gasoline cap-and-trade program. The plan aims to reduce transportation-related tailpipe emissions, and would levy a tax on fuel companies based on carbon dioxide emissions. The most ambitious version of the plan is projected to reduce the area's tailpipe emissions by 25% between 2022 and 2032. The program is in the public comment phase, with individual states determining whether to participate. The program could begin as early as 2022.

See also 
 List of U.S. states and territories by carbon dioxide emissions
 Plug-in electric vehicles in Maine

References

Further reading 
 -- this chapter of the National Climate Assessment covers Northeast states

Maine
Environment of Maine